Trichostigma is a genus of flowering plants in the family Petiveriaceae. It was formerly placed in the family Phytolaccaceae. It is native to the Caribbean islands, Central America, and South America. The genus consists of perennial shrubs or vines, with axillary or terminal racemes of 5-30 flowers.

Species
 Trichostigma octandrum - Hoopvine 
 Trichostigma peruvianum
 Trichostigma polyandrum
 Trichostigma rivinoides

References

 UniProt entry
 A. Richard in R. de la Sagra, Hist. Fis. Cuba. 10: 306. 1845.

Petiveriaceae
Caryophyllales genera